The Focke-Achgelis Fa 325 Krabbe was a proposed rotary wing transport designed in Nazi Germany by Focke-Achgelis in 1942.

Design and development
Heinrich Focke began designing the Fa 325 for the Kriegsmarine, which was interested in a torpedo-armed helicopter. The design had four rotors, and was, effectively, two Focke-Achgelis Fa 223 Draches attached to each other, powered by two Bramo 301R-3 radial engines (BMW development of the Bramo 323 Fafnir engine for helicopter use). The Kriegsmarine leadership withdrew from the Fa 325 project in 1943, and Focke ceased further development.

See also
Focke-Achgelis Fa 223
Focke-Achgelis Fa 330
Focke-Achgelis Fa 269

References

Fa 325
1940s German military transport aircraft
1940s German helicopters
World War II helicopters of Germany
Twin-engined piston helicopters